"Jenny Don't Be Hasty" is a song by Scottish singer-songwriter Paolo Nutini, written with Jimmy Hogarth and produced by Ken Nelson. The song was released as Nutini's second single on 25 September 2006 from his debut album, These Streets (2006).

The lyrics, a personal experience of the singer, are about an 18-year-old boy who wants to have a relationship with an older woman who is angry at him for having lied to her about his real age and now says he is too young. "Jenny Don't Be Hasty" song reached number 20 on the UK Singles Chart, and in Australia, it peaked at number 40 on the ARIA Singles Chart in April 2007.

Track listings

UK and European CD single
 "Jenny Don't Be Hasty"
 "January"

UK enhanced CD single
 "Jenny Don't Be Hasty"
 "Rainbows"
 "Jenny Don't Be Hasty" (video)
 "Jenny Don't Be Hasty" (making of the video)

UK 7-inch single
A. "Jenny Don't Be Hasty"
B. "Rainbows"

Australian CD single
 "Jenny Don't Be Hasty"
 "January" (live from Glasgow Garage, July 2006)
 "Rainbows" (live from Glasgow Garage, July 2006)

Charts

Weekly charts

Year-end charts

Certifications

References

2006 singles
2006 songs
Atlantic Records UK singles
Paolo Nutini songs
Song recordings produced by Ken Nelson (British record producer)
Songs written by Jimmy Hogarth
Songs written by Paolo Nutini